Alicia Pamela Kennedy, Baroness Kennedy of Cradley, Baroness Kennedy of Southwark (born 22 March 1969) is a British Labour politician and member of the House of Lords.

Early life
Kennedy attended the University of Warwick between 1988 and 1991, gaining a BSc in psychology.

Professional career
She worked as a regional organiser for the Labour Party, 1995–1997, political advisor to Joan Ruddock MP, 1997-1998 and a policy advisor to the leader of the London Borough of Lambeth, 1999–2000.

She then worked for the party's central organisation, including as Chief of Staff, 2001-2005 and Deputy General Secretary, 2006–2011. She was an advisor to party leader Ed Miliband from 2011 to 2013.

In June 2020 she was appointed Director of Generation Rent. In July 2021, in the wake of the Covid crisis, she and Lord Bird of Notting Hill called for an end to section 21 evictions in the private rental sector. In March 2022 she joined calls for a rent freeze in London.

Political career
On 19 September 2013, she was created a life peer as Baroness Kennedy of Cradley, of Cradley in the Metropolitan Borough of Dudley on the nomination from Labour leader Ed Miliband.

In the House of Lords she was a member of Joint Committee on the Draft Modern Slavery Bill which examined the proposals from the Government and presently serves on the Affordable Childcare Committee.

In 2014 she was elected as a councillor in the London Borough of Lewisham representing Brockley. She resigned in September 2016.

Personal life
She is married to Roy Kennedy, Baron Kennedy of Southwark, a fellow Labour peer and a Lewisham councillor.

References

External links
 Baroness Kennedy of Cradley – House of Lords
 Alicia Kennedy – LinkedIn

1969 births
Living people
Alumni of the University of Warwick
Labour Party (UK) life peers
Life peeresses created by Elizabeth II
Labour Party (UK) councillors
Councillors in the London Borough of Lewisham
Spouses of life peers
Women councillors in England